Phyllogomphoides is a genus of dragonflies in the family Gomphidae. They are commonly known as leaftails. It contains the following species:

References

 
Gomphidae
Anisoptera genera